List of railway lines in Japan lists existing railway lines in Japan alphabetically.

The difference between the two is a legal, and not always substantial, one. Some regional rails are classified as kidō, while some light rails are actually tetsudō. There are also other railways not legally classified as either tetsudō or kidō, such as airport people movers, slope cars (automated small rack monorails), or amusement park rides. Those lines are not listed here.

According to the laws, tetsudō/kidō include conventional railways (over ground or underground, including subways), as well as maglev trains, monorails, new transit systems (a blanket term roughly equivalent to people mover or automated guideway transit in other countries), skyrails (automated small cable monorails), trams, trolleybuses, guideway buses, funiculars (called "cable cars" in Japan), and aerial lifts. Among them, all but aerial lifts are listed here. See the list of aerial lifts in Japan article for aerial lifts.

Some industrial railways are also classified as tetsudō/kidō, while some are not. However, this list does not include any industrial railways. See the corresponding Japanese article for the listing.

Tetsudō/kidō also include (non-funicular) cable cars, horsecars, and handcars, but those modes of transportation have already disappeared from the country.

The list basically shows line names without operator names. When the official line name does include the operator name, the line is listed twice, with and without the operator.

To make the search easier, official nicknames and unofficial common names are also listed.

Some English names are tentative translations.

See also
List of railway companies in Japan
Rail transport in Japan
List of railway stations in Japan
List of railway electrification systems in Japan
List of aerial lifts in Japan
List of airport people mover systems
List of defunct railway companies in Japan
:ja:専用鉄道 (Industrial railway)
:ja:未成線 (Uncompleted line)
Monorails in Japan

Gallery
These modes of transport are all classified as railways in Japan.

These are not classified as railways in Japan and are thus not covered in this article.

Japan
 
Lines

zh:日本鐵路線一覽